Joel Thomas Crow (30 June 1887 – 26 May 1958) was an Australian rules footballer who played with Essendon and Melbourne in the Victorian Football League (VFL).

Notes

External links 

1887 births
Australian rules footballers from Victoria (Australia)
Essendon Football Club players
Melbourne Football Club players
1958 deaths